Tonka Bay is a city in Hennepin County, Minnesota, United States. It is located on Lake Minnetonka between the upper and lower lakes. It gained some popularity in the 1880s and 1890s as a summer lake resort. The population of Tonka Bay was 1,475 at the 2010 census.

Geography
Manitou Road serves as a main route.

History
Circa 10,000 B.C. – Tonka Bay forms during the recession of the last glaciation – the Wisconsin. Upper and Lower Lake Minnetonka and the peninsula and bays that now make up Tonka Bay forms as the ice sheet retreats.

1852 – Signing of Treaty of Traverse des Sioux that opens up the Lake Minnetonka area to white settlement.

1852 –Territorial Governor Alexander Ramsey explores Lake Minnetonka and officially names it “Minne” (Sioux for water) and “Tonka” (Sioux for big or strong).

1853 – Reverend Stephen Hull comes to the area. He creates the first narrows, “Hull’s Narrows,” located nearby present-day County Road 19 north of West Point Road. The Narrows allows boats to pass between Upper and Lower Lake Minnetonka.

1864 - Horticulturist Peter Gideon claimed  in what would become Tonka Bay. Here he propagated the "Wealthy" apple, which can survive the harsh Minnesota winters, named for his wife Wealthy Hull.

1879 – The Lake Park Hotel is built as part of the Chautauqua movement.

1887 – Old Orchard House is built by John Finley Wilcox. He plants hundreds of acres of orchards that once stood alongside County Road 19.

1890 – Fred B. Snyder buys the 28-acre Clay Cliffe Estate for $56.

1901 – Tonka Bay incorporates in response to the need to provide services for its increasingly stable population. Wilcox becomes Tonka Bay’s first mayor.

1904 –Tonka Bay elementary school is built.

1908 – The Twin City Rapid Transit Company purchases the Lake Park Hotel and changes its name to the Tonka Bay Hotel. It closes in 1911.

1911 – The first bridge over the narrows is built in Tonka Bay.

1913 –Tonka Bay Marine is founded by the Westman Family.

1953 –Tonka Bay’s elementary school becomes Tonka Bay Village Hall.

1955 – Minnetonka Plaza constructed.

Late 1980s to mid 1990s– New developments are built on the grounds of great estates of the past, such as the Clay Cliffe Estate, Arbor Shores, and the W.O. Winston Estate, now known as the subdivision of Gideon’s Point.

2002 - Police/Fire Campus constructed.

2003 to 2004 – Plaza renamed Tonka Village Shopping Center, Liquor Store sold to County for demolition to make way for County Road 19 reconstruction.

2011 - 12 boat slips were added to the City Marina.

2016 - City Monument installed at southern town border.

2017 – City Monument at northern town border.

Formerly part of Excelsior Township, Tonka Bay was incorporated as an independent village in 1901.

Demographics

2010 census
As of the census of 2010, there were 1,475 people, 586 households, and 458 families living in the city. The racial makeup of the city was 97.6% White, 0.8% African American, 0.1% Native American, 0.7% Asian, 0.1% from other races, and 0.7% from two or more races. Hispanic or Latino of any race were 0.9% of the population.

There were 586 households, of which 31.6% had children under the age of 18 living with them, 68.6% were married couples living together, 4.8% had a female householder with no husband present, 4.8% had a male householder with no wife present, and 21.8% were non-families. 18.9% of all households were made up of individuals, and 6.1% had someone living alone who was 65 years of age or older. The average household size was 2.52 and the average family size was 2.87.

The median age in the city was 47.8 years. 23.6% of residents were under the age of 18; 5.2% were between the ages of 18 and 24; 15.2% were from 25 to 44; 41.8% were from 45 to 64; and 14.3% were 65 years of age or older. The gender makeup of the city was 51.4% male and 48.6% female.

2000 census
As of the census of 2000, there were 1,547 people, 614 households, and 456 families living in the city. The racial makeup of the city was 98.64% White, 0.13% African American, 0.06% Native American, 0.39% Asian, 0.52% from other races, and 0.26% from two or more races. Hispanic or Latino of any race were 1.42% of the population.

There were 614 households, out of which 34.5% had children under the age of 18 living with them, 65.5% were married couples living together, 5.0% had a female householder with no husband present, and 25.7% were non-families. 20.2% of all households were made up of individuals, and 3.7% had someone living alone who was 65 years of age or older.  The average household size was 2.52 and the average family size was 2.90.

In the city, the population was spread out, with 24.8% under the age of 18, 4.7% from 18 to 24, 27.8% from 25 to 44, 33.9% from 45 to 64, and 8.8% who were 65 years of age or older.  The median age was 41 years. For every 100 females, there were 104.1 males.  For every 100 females age 18 and over, there were 103.7 males.

The median income for a household in the city was $84,879, and the median income for a family was $90,783. Males had a median income of $69,375 versus $41,328 for females. The per capita income for the city was $50,825.  About 1.9% of families and 2.2% of the population were below the poverty line, including 2.1% of those under age 18 and 1.5% of those age 65 or over.

Politics

Sports
As of 2017, the latest champion of the USA Rink Bandy League is Tonka Bay Bombers.

References

External links
City of Tonka Bay

Cities in Hennepin County, Minnesota
Cities in Minnesota